Bulawayo Railway Museum (established 1972) is a railway museum located at Bulawayo railway station in Zimbabwe that houses several exhibitions on the history of the railway system in Zimbabwe, formerly Rhodesia. Its oldest exhibits date back to 1897, and include Cecil Rhodes' personal railway coach. The museum is owned by National Railways of Zimbabwe (NRZ). Due to the severe shortage of rolling stock, some steam locomotives from the museum have, in the past, been refurbished and returned to service.

Exhibits 
Main exhibits are grouped into seven different classes namely:

 Steam Locomotives
 Diesel Electric Locomotives
 Coaches and Saloons
 Wagons
 Trolleys
 Railway Cranes
 Other Miscellaneous Items

Steam Locomotives 
 Lawley. 4-4-0. Falcon.
 Small Class #1. 0-6-0 Tank. 'Rhodesia'.
 Small Class #7. 0-6-0 Saddle Tank. 'Jack Tar'.
 6th Class #19. 4-8-2 Tank. .
 7th Class. #43. 4-8-0.
 9A Class. #122. 4-8-0.
 9B Class. #115. 4-8-0.
 10th Class. #98. 4-8-0.
 11th Class. #127. 4-8-2.
 12th Class. #190. 4-8-2.
 14th Class. #507. 2-6-2+2-6-2 Garratt.
 16th Class. #600. 2-8-2+2-8-2 Garratt.
 19th Class. #330. 4-8-2. Henschel.
 20th Class. #730. 4-8-2+2-8-4 Garratt.
 20th Class. #736. 4-8-2+2-8-4 Garratt.
 20A Class. #740. 4-8-2+2-8-4 Garratt.

Diesel Electric Locomotives 
 Class DE1. #0106. Davenport.
 Class  DE2. #1200. English Electric.
 Class DE3. #1314. English Electric.
 Class DE4. #1407. Brush.
 Class DE5. #1531. David Poole (Jung).
 Class DE7. #1708. SGP.
 Class DE8B. #1837. Sorefame.
 Class DE8B. #1845. Sorefame.

Coaches 
 Dining Car #660. Chimanimani.
 C6 - Enginemens Caboose #21
 Enginemens Caboose #25
 Guards Van #89035
 C5 - Eye Surgery Coach #1823
 C3 - Rhodes Private Saloon
 C2 - Chaplain's service coach #872
 First Class coach #1045.
 First Class balcony coach #1058.
 Second Class balcony coach #2024.

Goods Wagons 
 Short open wagon (wood)
 Short Livestock Wagon. (wood).
 4 Wheel wooden underframe (Oldbury Rly Carriage Co Ltd.)
 Short explosives wagon EOZ 134167
 Short wooden 'K' wagon. RRKUK 843429
 Long Aluminium 'K' wagon. URR KHB
 Short metal 'K' wagon. URR KOZ

Trolleys 
 T3 - used by Engineers to inspect the railway line 
 Victoria Falls Trolley

Railway Cranes 
 Booth Bros Crane
 Ransomes & Rapier Crane

Artifacts, Art and Photography 
There are also a number of items and pieces of art related to the railway industry at the museum. These include pictures of the day the Queen of the United Kingdom visited Rhodesia, pictures of the "white train", a chronicle of Rhodes' death with his furniture in his coach, typewriters, train ticketing machines, train tickets, train passes, train destination boards, models of locomotives and coaches.

Buildings 
There are two key buildings at the Bulawayo Railway Museum. The first one, right by the entrance, is the Shamva Station and the other is the Main Hall which houses many of the special exhibits.

Shamva Station 
This is a typical Rhodesian Railways station building, dismantled and moved from Shamva to the museum to serve as the main reception. It consists of a ticketing office with most of the notice boards and equipment (rain gauge, fire extinguishers, etc) a railway station was expected to have during Rhodesian Railway times.

Main Hall 
This hall was once the mechanical workshop of the Bulawayo station. In it can be found much of the mechanical equipment used there and at the station. There is also a wall of fame of Chief Mechanical Engineers since the start of Rhodesia Railways until 2013. This hall houses the most important exhibits at the Museum.

Management and Ownership 
The Museum is owned by National Railways of Zimbabwe, but before that it was owned and formed by Rhodesia Railways. It is managed by Mr. Gordon Murray, a long serving member of the company but subsequently a pensioner.

References

Further reading

External links

 Unofficial museum homepage
 Photographs of the museum
Friends of the Bulawayo Railway Museum

Railway museums in Zimbabwe
Museums in Zimbabwe
Buildings and structures in Bulawayo
Tourist attractions in Bulawayo
1970s establishments in Rhodesia